Erik Thomas Pohlmeier (born July 20, 1971) is an American prelate of the Catholic Church who has been serving as bishop of the Diocese of St. Augustine since 2022.

Biography
Erik Pohlmeier was born on July 20, 1971, in Colorado Springs, Colorado, one of five children of Tom and Sharon Pohlmeier. He was ordained a priest for the Diocese of Little Rock by Bishop Andrew McDonald on July 25, 1998.

Pope Francis appointed Pohlmeier bishop of the Diocese of St. Augustine on May 24, 2022. He is fluent in Spanish. Pohlmeier was consecrated as bishop by Archbishop Thomas Gerard Wenski on July 22, 2022. He chose as his episcopal motto: "Seek first the kingdom of God" (Mt 6:33).

See also

 Catholic Church hierarchy
 Catholic Church in the United States
 Historical list of the Catholic bishops of the United States
 List of Catholic bishops of the United States
 Lists of patriarchs, archbishops, and bishops

References

External links
Roman Catholic Diocese of St. Augustine Official Site

 

1971 births
Living people
American Roman Catholic priests
Bishops appointed by Pope Francis
Pontifical Gregorian University alumni
Pontifical University of Saint Thomas Aquinas alumni
People from Colorado Springs, Colorado